Kuching International Airport (Initialised: KIA)  is an international airport serving the entire southwestern region of Sarawak, Malaysia. The airport is colocated with the RMAF Kuching, home to the No. 7 Squadron RMAF.

The airport terminal is capable of handling five million passengers per annum and it is the fourth busiest airport in Malaysia. KIA has grown rapidly with an increasing number of passengers and aircraft movement. In 2017, KIA handled 5,095,193 passengers with a corresponding volume of 51,097 flights. In the same year, 24,620 metric tonnes of cargo were handled through this facility.

KIA is the secondary hub for Malaysia Airlines and has been growing rapidly to tackle the demand of the travellers in the Sarawak region.

History 

An airport terminal building was later completed and opened for use on 26 September 1950. The airport consisted of a small "L" shaped single storey passenger terminal, a small cargo facility, and an airport fire station. Air Traffic Control Tower, Meteorological Service and Maintenance building were clustered in one area, a small apron of 4 parking bays and a single runway which was 1,372 metres long and 46 metres wide. Navigational (Directional Finding Equipment) and Radio Aids were installed at the airport.

Kuching International Airport then became the gateway to Sarawak, Brunei and North Borneo (Sabah as it is called today) with the introduction of once weekly Douglas Dakota twin-engined piston aircraft services originating from Singapore by Malayan Airways. By the end of 1954, scheduled air services into Kuching International Airport grew by leaps and bounds. This was depicted in the 1954 statistics which recorded 1,550 aircraft movements, 13,564 passengers, 95,911 kilogrammes of cargo and 25,984 mails. In 1959, the runway was extended to 1,555 metres in length to make way for Vickers Viscount turboprop aircraft operations.

In 1962, the runway was extended once more to a length of 1,921 meters to facilitate DeHavilland Comet-4 turbojet aircraft operations. The terminal was also enlarged in the same year. A Control Zone was established at Kuching in November as a part of a plan to provide an Air Traffic Control Service commensurate with the growth of air traffic. Malayan Airways Limited operated the Singapore / British Borneo Territories Regional Services with Vickers Viscount and Douglas DC-3 aircraft, daily schedules linked Kuching and Sibu with Singapore on the other side; and connection via Borneo Airways to Brunei and Borneo on the other.

In 1971, the Malaysian Government (as Sarawak joined the Federation of Malaysia on 16 November 1963) engaged a team of Canadian Consultants to make a Master Plan study of Kuching International Airport.

In December 1972, the government accepted the Consultant's report. Among the recommendations were:
 The extension and strengthening of existing runway to enable operations by larger jet-powered aircraft
 The construction of a new terminal building on the north site of the runway

In 1980, consistent with the advent of Airbus A300B4 operations, it was imperative that the runway pavement strength be upgraded to meet the requirements of that particular aircraft. Work on this was completed in early 1982.

Construction of the terminal complex at the north site took a centre stage at the end of 1978 and was completed in July 1983. This modern terminal replaced the previous terminal, and was opened for business on 24 August 1983. The terminal complex covered a built-up area of 81 hectares with a floor space of 13,000 square metres, comprised the three-storey passenger terminal flanked by neatly planned buildings which consisted of the Air Traffic Control Tower and operations block, a larger freight facility, a new airport fire station, Maintenance Building, VIP Building and ancillary services building.

As of 1999, two foreign airlines (Singapore Airlines and Royal Brunei Airlines) from both Singapore and Brunei as well as Malaysia's national carrier and as many as 8 private general aviation companies operated scheduled services into and out of Kuching International Airport. Non-scheduled charter flights were also operated by two foreign airlines. As of 2018, however, four of Malaysia's airlines (Malaysia Airlines, MasWings, Air Asia and Malindo Air) as well as four cargo operators (Asia Cargo Express, MASKargo, Raya Airways and Neptune Air) operate to and from Kuching International Airport. They are joined by three foreign carriers (Royal Brunei Airlines, Scoot and Wings Air). In 2019, Royal Brunei, in a joint venture with Malindo Air, further connected Kuching to BWN using Malindo Air's ATR aircraft. Foreign airlines that have previously provided services to Kuching were Singapore Airlines, Dragonair, Hong Kong Airlines, Jetstar Asia, Merpati Nusantara Airlines, Silk Air, Batavia Air, Kalstar Airlines, Xpress Air and Tiger Airways.  The latter returned to Kuching after merging with Scoot while Xpress Air stopped services following stiff competition from AirAsia and Wings Air on the Kuching-Pontianak route as well as Xpress Air concentrating on domestic routes due to Xpress Air's core business.

As a result of the increasing number of passengers going into and out of Kuching, a completely new and larger terminal was needed. Construction started in the early 2000s, and progressed at an incredible pace. The new terminal was literally constructed from the inside out, with the old terminal slowly being chipped away and replaced by new sections of the new terminal. The new terminal complex was finally opened on 16 January 2006 by the Chief Minister of Sarawak Pehin Sri Haji Abdul Taib Mahmud and the then Malaysian Minister of Transport Dato' Sri Chan Kong Choy. The full work on the terminal, however, was only completed in April 2006. The new terminal consists of 12 aerobridge aircraft parking bays (4 bays for widebody aircraft such as Airbus A330/A350/A380-800, Boeing 747/777 and 5 bays for narrow body aircraft, principally Boeing 738/9 and A319/320), 4 remote parking bays (for turboprop aircraft such as Fokker 50, DHC-6-300/400 Twin Otter and ATR 72-500/600), plus 3 new aircraft parking bays located at the general aviation section.

Expansion, renovation and redevelopment 

Kuching International Airport was given a radical makeover, with the terminal completed in 2006 and the runway and taxiway extension fully completed in 2008. The renovations borrowed many design features from Kuala Lumpur's then-new airport (KL International Airport opened in 1998, replacing the overcrowded Subang-Sultan Abdul Aziz Shah Airport), so the two have a similar look.

The fully renovated terminal building was officially opened by the then Prime Minister of Malaysia Tun Abdullah Ahmad Badawi on Monday, 17 April 2006. The project was handled by Global Upline Sdn. Bhd. and it cost some MYR620,000,000 (US$186,000,000). With this, the airport is capable of handling widebody aircraft such as Boeing 747-400 and Airbus A380-800 (albeit with airside restrictions on the runway and taxiway network).

The completed works involved above ground-level (AGL) earthworks and pavement upgrades, extension of the runway length from 2454 metres to 3780 metres, widening of shoulders from 46 metres to 60 metres, extension of parallel taxiway to a full parallel taxiway with interconnection/rapid exit taxiways including widening of taxiway fillets and shoulders to 30 metres. The air-side apron works included the construction of a cargo apron, high-intensity lightings and markings. Visual and non-visual aids will be upgraded and/or relocated consistent with the upgrading plan to serve the extended runway. With nine gates, the airport can handle six narrow body aircraft (such as Boeing 737 and Airbus A320), three widebody aircraft and four turboprop aircraft. Of note, gate number 9 was specifically constructed for Airbus A380-800 operations.

Present and future 
The former Chief Minister of Sarawak, Pehin Sri Haji Abdul Taib Mahmud, wishes to attract more foreign airlines to KIA so as to develop the Sarawak Tourism Industry. Singapore's budget airline, Tiger Airways, had been given the green light to serve Kuching International Airport (the airline has since discontinued service to Kuching after only a few years, as did its closest competitor, Jetstar Asia).

As of 2006, Malaysia Airlines in Kuching International Airport has so far achieved a zero accident rate.

The Sarawak Government is working closely with Malaysia Airlines (MAS) and AirAsia to rationalise long-haul flights. Sarawak hopes to use Brunei and Singapore as entry points to enhance the two prevailing gateways – Kuala Lumpur International Airport (KLIA) and Kota Kinabalu International Airport (KKIA).

The Sarawak Government plans to set up a boutique airline to be operated by Hornbill Skyways, a state-owned airline company. The airline's operations would also focus on a strategic hub and that the initial plan is to provide direct flights from Sarawak to Singapore, Kuala Lumpur, Jakarta, Bangkok and Hong Kong.

The head office of Hornbill Skyways is in North Pan Hangar at Kuching International Airport.

Airlines and destinations

Passenger

Cargo

Traffic and statistics

Traffic

Statistics

Baggage handling system (BHS) 

Kuching International Airport has two sides of baggage reclaim halls, one is for the domestic flights (within Sarawak) while the other one is for both international flights and flights outside Sarawak.

Immigration 
As one of the two states in Malaysia which controls its own immigration autonomy, Sarawak exercises special regulation upon arriving and departing from all Sarawakian airports including Kuching. All passengers travelling with any flights from outside Sarawak (including all flights from Peninsular Malaysia, Sabah, Federal Territory of Labuan and outside Malaysia), must pass through the immigration control at the first entry airport.

Ground transportation 
No city buses are available. The nearest bus station which is Kuching Sentral Bus Terminal, is located 2 km away. A taxi coupon ticket can be bought at the Taxi Coupon Counter. Ridesharing services provided by Grab, Maxim, and Gojo are also available.

Awards and recognition 
 KIA received the MS ISO 9001:2000 for Airport Management, Operations and Maintenance of Airport Covering Fire and Rescue Services, Aviation Security, Engineering and General Operations in the year of 2005.
 Aerodrome Certification from the Department of Civil Aviation (DCA) was awarded to KIA in 2005 where KIA is being the second airport in Malaysia, after Kuala Lumpur International Airport to receive the prestigious certification.
 MAS in Kuching International Airport (KIA) achieved zero occupational accidents in 2006, making it one of the best stations in the country.
 Kuching International Airport was accorded Platinum and Star status by International Air Transport Association (IATA) in recognition of their barcoded boarding passes project as well as satisfying various guidelines from check-in, baggage drop and security control to boarding.

Incidents and accidents 
 On Feb 27 2006, a DHL cargo plane of skidded at the end of the runway of the airport when landing at 6.20 am.
 On 1 September 2006, Malaysia Airlines (MAS) Kuala Lumpur-bound flight MH2507 which was speeding to takeoff on the Kuching International Airport (KIA) runway screeched to a stop, just metres away from the runway limit. A faulty engine suddenly lost power forcing the pilot to abort flight, grounding the Airbus 330 which failed to take off at 11.05 am. Passengers waited at the KIA departure lounge for almost seven hours before their replacement flight departed at 5.30 pm. Passengers of the fully booked flight included several members of the Organisation of Islamic Countries' (OIC) delegates, in the State capital for the Merdeka celebration.
 On 13 January 2007, a Boeing 737-200 belonging to the Gading Sari Aviation Services Sdn Bhd crash-landed while attempting to land at 5.52 am. The aircraft's fuselage was badly damaged, and the landing gears and right engine were torn off during the crash. All four crew members escaped unhurt. The airport was closed for six hours while the plane was towed away from the crash site and debris cleared from the runway. Departures and arrivals of 16 MAS and 14 AirAsia flights were delayed affecting 2,200 passengers – 1,000 passengers of MAS and 1,200 from AirAsia. An earlier flight from Kuala Lumpur had to be diverted to Miri Airport. Damage included navigational lights – eight taxi lights, five runway edge lights, two end lights, and one precision approach path indicator. It reopened at noon.
 On 2 October 2009, Malaysia Airlines Boeing 737-4H6 9M-MMR was substantially damaged when the port main undercarriage collapsed while the aircraft was parked at the gate.
 On 10 January 2011, AirAsia Flight 5218 skidded on the runway whilst landing in a heavy downpour. Four passengers were hospitalised.

See also 

 Indonesia–Malaysia confrontation
 Far East Air Force (Royal Air Force)
 List of former Royal Air Force stations

References

External links 

 Kuching International Airport at Malaysia Airports Holdings Berhad
 
 

Airports in Sarawak
Airports established in 1950